Aris Limassol (Greek: Άρης Λεμεσού) is a Cypriot football club based in Limassol and one of the founder members of Cyprus Football Association. The club's colours are green, black and white, and their home is the Alphamega Stadium. Founded in 1930, Aris Limassol is one of the most historic football clubs of Limassol.

The club also maintains teams in other sports including basketball, table tennis and chess. The Aris chess team dominated Cypriot chess in the 1980s. The Aris chess team still plays matches on chess.com.

History
One of the founder members of the Cyprus Football Association, Aris competed in the first five seasons of the Cypriot First Division, with their league placement ranging from 5th to 7th. The club ceased operation in 1939 due to financial difficulties, and returned in 1952, competing in the Second Division.  Aris returned to the First Division in 1954, but finished last and was relegated. The following season they won the Second Division and returned to the top-tier league, only to be relegated again. Aris returned to the First Division once more the following season, placing 4th, the club's best league placement to date.

Being one of the weaker teams in the First Division during the 1960s, they were finally relegated in the 1969–70 season, placing 12th, and spent two years in the Second Division. The situation improved for Aris, with the team finishing 4th in the First Division, in the 1976–77 and 1978–79 seasons. In 1981, they were relegated again after finishing last but returned as runner-ups the following season and finished 5th in the 1985–86 season. The greatest success of the club came in 1989, when the team qualified to the final of the Cypriot Cup, where they lost to AEL Limassol. The following season, Aris signed Oleh Blokhin, the 1975 European Footballer of the Year, who helped them finish 4th in the league. At the end of the season, Blokhin ended his career playing for Aris Limassol.

Following relegation in 1993, Aris won the Second Division for the third time in the club's history. From 1997 until 2006, the team would be relegated to the Second Division every year, and would return to the First Division the following year. This situation ended in the 2006–07 season, when the team managed to remain in the First Division, placing 8th. However, the following season Aris was relegated once more,and the trend returned. After 9 years of drought, Aris managed to remain in the First Division in the 2015–16 season, finishing in 10th place. This season, Aris was the only team which played more than 6 Cypriot players in every match. After three seasons in the First Division, Aris was relegated and spent another three seasons in the Second Division, before being promoted once more in the 2020-21 season.

In Summer 2021, a new era began for Aris, with the Russian investor Vladimir Federov, who intends to transform Aris into one of the elite clubs of Cyprus. The following season, Aris finished fourth in the league, meaning the club had qualified for the 2022-23 UEFA Europa Conference League, the first time the club had ever qualified for European football. They made their European debut in the second qualifying round against Neftçi Baku, and despite a 2-0 win at home, Aris lost 3-0 in the second tie, and was eliminated.

Supporters 
Aris has a smaller number of fans compared to other Limassol clubs, but these are very committed to their club.

Choir
The Aris choir was established in 1938 by the conductor and composer Solon Michaelides who remained its conductor until 1956. In 1962, the choir returned the direction of Marinos Mitellas and remains one of the best-known Hellenic choirs performing in Cyprus, Greece and internationally.

Players

 

 

 

 

 
 

For recent transfers, see List of Cypriot football transfers summer 2022

Out on loan

Active International players

Foreign players

Technical and medical staff

Managerial history
  Tadeáš Kraus (1976–80), (1983–85)
  Andreas Michaelides (1986–91)
  Jerzy Engel (1997)
  Milenko Špoljarić (2004–05)
  Andreas Michaelides (2006–07)
  Henk Houwaart (1 September 2007 – 30 November 2007)
  Mihai Stoichiţă (2007–08)
  Akis Agiomamitis (2008–09)
  Marios Constantinou (17 May 2009 – 18 January 2010)
  Stéphane Demol (21 Feb 2010 – 30 June 2010)
  Dušan Mitošević (18 July 2011 – 30 June 2012)
  Demetris Ioannou (1 July 2012 – 22 June 2013)
  Tasos Kyriacou (1 July 2012 – 22 October 2013)
  Ton Caanen (23 Oct 2013 – 11 May 2014)
  Giorgos Polyviou (16 Jun 2014 – 14 October 2014)
  Akis Agiomamitis (14 Oct 2014 – 14 September 2015)
  Eugen Neagoe (15 September 2015 – 7 February 2016)
  Kostas Kaiafas (8 Feb 2016 – 15 May 2016)
  Thalis Theodoridis (24 Jun 2016 – 24 October 2016)
  Frederik Vanderbiest (1 Nov 2016 – 3 January 2017)
  Nicolas Martides (Jan 2017 – 3 October 2017)
  Giannis Christopoulos (4 Oct 2017 – 22 January 2018)
  Nicos Panayiotou (22 Jan 2018 – 13 March 2018)
  Chrysis Michael (26 Apr 2018 – 13 January 2019)
  Nicolas Martides (13 Jan 2019 – 31 May 2019)
  Liasos Louka (11 Jul 2019 – 26 February 2022)
  Aleksey Shpilevsky (26 Feb 2022 – )

Honours
 Cypriot Cup
Runners-up (1): 1988–89
 Cypriot Second Division
Winners (5): 1953–54, 1955–56, 1993–94, 2010–11, 2012–13

European record

Matches

References

External links
 Aris Limassol official website
 Aris Limassol official Facebook Page
 Aris Limassol Fans Facebook Page
 Aris Limassol official Twitter Page
 Aris Limassol Fans Twitter Page
 Aris Limassol official YouTube Channel
 Aris Limassol Fans YouTube Channel

 
Football clubs in Cyprus
Association football clubs established in 1930
1930 establishments in Cyprus